The Aerostar AG-6 (also known as the IAR AG-6) was a prototype Romanian agricultural aircraft of the late 1980s, developed for IAv, of Bacău. The company was later known as Aerostar. 

The AG-6 was a single-engine biplane, of which a single example was built, with no production following.

Design and development
In 1986, a team led by the engineer Constantin Rosca began work at the Romanian Aviation Institute on the design of a single-engine agricultural aircraft, the AG-6. The AG-6 was a single-engine tractor biplane with a fixed tailwheel undercarriage, and had a similar layout to the American Grumman Ag-Cat. The aircraft's fuselage was of welded steel tube construction, with the forward fuselage and wings covered in duralumin and the rear fuselage fabric covered. The pilot sat in an enclosed cockpit aft of the wings, with a glassfibre hopper  for liquid or powered agricultural chemicals fitted forward of the cockpit.

A prototype was built at the Bacău factory of IAv (Intreprinderea de Avione) (now Aerostar), making its first flight on 12 January 1989. In 1991, the Romanian aircraft industry was privatised, but a shortage of finance resulted in several projects, including the AG-6, being abandoned. Only the single prototype was built.

Specifications

References

1980s Romanian agricultural aircraft
Aircraft first flown in 1989